The Battle of Saltholm was fought on 9 June 1808 during the Gunboat War. Danish and Norwegian ships attacked a British convoy off the island of Saltholm in Øresund Strait near Copenhagen.{{efn|Danish sources place the battle in Flinterenden, the channel between the island of Saltholm and Malmø.

The convoy of 70 British merchant vessels left Malmö Roads under the escort of three Royal Navy brigs and one bomb vessel.

The Danes and the Norwegian assembled twenty-one gunboats and seven mortar boats for the attack. Once the Dano-Norwegian force attacked, the battle was over within twenty minutes.

Turbulent, under the command of Lieutenant George Wood, was bringing up the rear. She and Thunder engaged while the remaining ships attempted to flee. This proved difficult as the wind was very calm, which allowed the Danish and Norwegians to row up to and board several of the British merchantmen. Turbulent was finally dismasted, which forced her to strike. Still, her resistance enabled most of the merchant fleet to escape. The Dano-Norwegian force captured 12 or 13 merchant vessels, plus Turbulent.Thunder escaped with some damage.

Postscripts
The subsequent court-martial of Lieutenant Wood for the loss of his ship acquitted him of all charges.

Although the Danish gunboats were active, this convoy was the only one to suffer a large loss. Still, the loss of the 12 ships led northern English merchants to publish a public protest against the Royal Navy in Hull.

Notes

Citations

References
Voelcker, Tim (2008) Admiral Saumarez versus Napoleon: The Baltic 1807 - 1812. (Boydell & Brewer). 
(Danish) Topsøe-Jensen, T.A. og Emil Marquard (1932) Officerer i Den dansk-norske søetat 1660-1814 og Den danske søetat 1814-1932. (Officers of the Danish-Norwegian Naval Service)

Battles of the Gunboat War
Conflicts in 1808
June 1808 events